The South Africa women's cricket team played the West Indies women's cricket team in September and October 2018. The tour consisted of three Women's One Day Internationals (WODIs), which formed part of the 2017–20 ICC Women's Championship, and five Women's Twenty20 Internationals (WT20I). The WODI series was drawn 1–1, after the second match finished in a no result. The WT20I series was drawn 2–2, with the third match of the series being abandoned.

Squads

Ahead of the tour, Trisha Chetty and Shabnim Ismail were ruled of South Africa's squads, with Chetty being replaced by Faye Tunnicliffe.

WODI series

1st WODI

2nd WODI

3rd WODI

WT20I series

1st WT20I

2nd WT20I

3rd WT20I

4th WT20I

5th WT20I

Notes

References

External links
 Series home at ESPN Cricinfo

South Africa 2018-19
West Indies 2018-19
International cricket competitions in 2018–19
2017–20 ICC Women's Championship
2018 in South African cricket
2019 in South African cricket
2018 in West Indian cricket
2019 in West Indian cricket
2018 in women's cricket
2019 in women's cricket